is a passenger railway station located in the town of Ayagawa, Kagawa, Japan.  It is operated by the private transportation company Takamatsu-Kotohira Electric Railroad (Kotoden) and is designated station "K14".

Lines
Ayagawa Station is a statin on the Kotoden Kotohira Line and is located 19.8 km from the opposing terminus of the line at Takamatsu-Chikkō Station.

Layout
The station consists of one 85-meter side platform serving a single bi-directional track. The station is unattended. Station facilities include toilets, with wheelchair-accessible facilities, and a car park for approximately 200 cars.

Adjacent stations

History
The station opened on 15 December 2013.

Surrounding area
 National Route 32
 Aeon Mall Ayagawa shopping mall

See also
 List of railway stations in Japan

References

External links

  

Railway stations in Kagawa Prefecture
Stations of Takamatsu-Kotohira Electric Railroad
Railway stations in Japan opened in 2013
Ayagawa, Kagawa